The men's 10,000 metres event at the 2019 European Athletics U23 Championships was held in Gävle, Sweden, at Gavlehof Stadium Park on 11 July.

Records
Prior to the competition, the records were as follows:

Results

References

10,000 metres
10,000 metres at the European Athletics U23 Championships